Tohuwabohu was an Austrian television cabaret and variety series 1990 to 1998.

See also
List of Austrian television series

External links
 

Austrian television series
1990 Austrian television series debuts
1998 Austrian television series endings
1990s Austrian television series
ORF (broadcaster)
German-language television shows